Shyamsundar D. Shinde is an Indian politician in the Peasants and Workers Party of India. He was elected as a member of the Maharashtra Legislative Assembly from Loha on 24 October 2019.

References

Living people
Members of the Maharashtra Legislative Assembly
Peasants and Workers Party of India politicians
Year of birth missing (living people)